The Island-class ferries are ferries owned and operated by BC Ferries. Six vessels were built between 2019 and 2021 by Damen Shipyards Group, a Dutch company, in Romania. The first two ships were launched in mid-March 2019, and commenced service in June 2020. Two of an additional four vessels commenced service in April 2022, and the remaining two are due to enter service in late 2022.

The vessels are powered by a diesel-electric hybrid system, and will transition to full electric operation when shore-side electric charging stations and funding becomes available.

Description 
The Island-class vessels were designed by Damen Shipyards Group as Damen Road Ferry 8117 E3, with input from both the public and BC Ferries. Each ship has the capacity for 47 vehicles, and between 300 and 450 passengers and crew. Features include a gallery deck for increased vehicle capacity, heated solariums on both sides of the sun deck, an indoor passenger lounge on the main car deck, and even a small pet area. The vessels are also the most environmentally friendly in the fleet, as they will switch from the current hybrid technology to operating fully electric when shore equipment is installed. In addition, the Island-class ships are extremely quiet, creating less underwater radiated noise disturbance to marine life and providing a more enjoyable sailing for passengers. BC Ferries has also said that the weather conditions tolerance of the Island class is similar to their larger major vessel classes. The vessels are double ended and are considered the minor class of the BC Ferries standardization plan.

Island-class vessels

Construction and service history 
The first two vessels were announced in 2017 and launched in March 2019. All vessels were built by Damen Shipyards Galati. Construction was completed in July, and the vessels were loaded on board a semi-submersible transport ship for the two-month crossing from Romania to Canada, and were delivered in Victoria, British Columbia on January 18, 2020. They entered service that same summer, June 10 on the Powell River to Texada Island route, and June 18 on the Alert Bay - Port McNeill - Sointula route respectively.

On November 6, 2019, BC Ferries ordered four more of the vessels, which are all due to enter service in 2022. Each vessel in this phase made the transatlantic voyage under its own power and temporary name. All four vessels were later named in the Kwakwaka'wakw indigenous language, replacing their temporary numbered name. Island 3 became  (meaning "dawn on the land) and Island 4 became  (meaning "porpoise") on August 23, 2021. Originally the new vessels were scheduled to enter service in the spring of 2022, however, the two vessels slated for the Quadra Island route have been tentatively delayed until early 2023, due to lack of available crew. Island Kwigwis and Island Gwawis entered service and replaced Quinsam on the Gabriola Island route on April 12, 2022. Most of the Island-class vessels underwent sea trials in the Saanich Inlet, near Victoria, and in Baynes Sound before their entry to service, and spent time at both the Point Hope Shipyard and BC Ferries Deas Dock.

The name Island Gwawis received backlash from Snuneymuxw First Nation on the grounds of discrimination, after the vessel, named in another First Nations language, operated through Snuneymuxw territory. The group had been invited to participate in the naming process along with other indigenous groups.

In its nearly first two years of service, the Island Discovery has been replaced multiple times by the Island Aurora, Island K'ulut'a, and Island Nagalis on the Powell River - Texada Island route due to mechanical issues. The Island K'ulut'a also spent a brief period of time on the Alert Bay - Port McNeill - Sointula route. In preparation for dual ship service on both Route 19 (Gabriola Island) and Route 23 (Quadra Island), the Island Aurora conducted test sailings with the primary vessel on the routes. Island Gwawis also test sailed in tandem with the Quinsam in the days leading up to the new service it would provide.

References 

Ships of BC Ferries
Ferry classes
Island Class ferries